1955 Academy Awards may refer to:

 27th Academy Awards, the Academy Awards ceremony that took place in 1955
 28th Academy Awards, the 1956 ceremony honoring the best in film for 1955